Gothra is a Hindu clan or lineage, an alternative spelling of Gotra

Gothra may also refer to the following places in India :
 Gothra, Bhiwani, village in Bhiwani district, Haryana, India
 Gothra, Rewari, village in Rewari district, Haryana, India
 Gothra, Rajasthan, town in JhunJhunu district, Rajasthan, India
 Gothra jagir, held by zamindars, a lineage of the princely Mir family of Darbar Sahibs of Kamadhia (Gujarat)